Year 1418 (MCDXVIII) was a common year starting on Saturday (link will display the full calendar) of the Julian calendar.

Events 
 January–December 
 January 31 – Mircea I of Wallachia is succeeded by Michael I of Wallachia.
 April 22 – The Council of Constance ends.
 May 29 – John the Fearless, Duke of Burgundy, captures Paris.

 July – The English Siege of Rouen begins.

 September 18 – King Taejong (r. 1400-1418) of the Joseon dynasty abdicates the throne. King Sejong ascends to the throne.

 Date unknown 
 João Gonçalves Zarco leads one of the first Portuguese expeditions to the Madeira Islands.

Births 
 January 9 – Juan Ramón Folch III de Cardona, Aragonese admiral (d. 1485)
 March 14 – Philip II, Count of Nassau-Weilburg (1429–1492) (d. 1492)
 April 20 – Earl David of Rookwood
 May 16 – John II of Cyprus, King of Cyprus and Armenia and also titular King of Jerusalem from 1432 to 1458 (d. 1458)
 August 5 – Malatesta Novello, Italian condottiero (d. 1465)
 September 24 – Anne of Cyprus, Italian noble (d. 1462)
 November 2 – Gaspare Nadi, Italian builder famous for his diary (diario) (d. 1504)
 November 20 – Robert de Morley, 6th Baron Morley, Lord of Morley Saint Botolph (d. 1442)
 December 8 – Queen Jeonghui, Queen consort of Korea (d. 1483)
 December 12 – Archduke Albert VI of Austria (d. 1463)
 date unknown – Peter II, Duke of Brittany (d. 1457)
 Isotta Nogarola, Italian writer and intellectual  (d. 1466)

Deaths 
 January 31 – Mircea I of Wallachia, ruler of Wallachia (b. 1355)
 March 22 – Dietrich of Nieheim, German historian
 June 2 – Katherine of Lancaster, queen of Henry III of Castile
 June 12 – Bernard VII, Count of Armagnac, Constable of France (b. 1360)
 November 25 – Henry Beaufort, 2nd Earl of Somerset (b. 1401)
 December 11 – Louis of Piedmont (b. 1364)
 date unknown 
 Ixtlilxochitl I, ruler of the Mesoamerican city-state of Texcoco, and ally of the Aztecs
 Foelke Kampana, Frisian lady and regent  (b. 1355)

References